Sarah Small (born 1979 in Washington D.C.) is a Brooklyn-based American artist, composer, singer, filmmaker, photographer, and performer featured on Yo-Yo Ma's Silk Road Ensemble's GRAMMY-Winning album, Sing Me Home.   She is known for her photographic and Tableau Vivant performance series The Delirium Constructions, singing as part of the Balkan vocal trio Black Sea Hotel, acting as the protagonist in the feature film Butter on the Latch by Josephine Decker, and directing the musical album, new music opera performance, and feature film Secondary Dominance.

Education and career 
She attended high school at The Field School, in Washington, D.C. and graduated from the Rhode Island School of Design in 2001 with a bachelor's degree in photography. 

After graduating from college, Small moved to Brooklyn and worked as a photographer for 13 years. Her work has appeared in publications including Vogue, Life Magazine, The New York Times, The Washington Post, and The Wall Street Journal, has been showcased by John Schaefer on WNYC’s Soundcheck and National Public Radio, and exhibited globally at venues including Galerie Caprice Horn (Berlin), Corcoran Gallery of Art (Washington DC), and the Australian Centre for Photography. She was named one of the “Top 13 Emerging Photographers” working today, by American Photo Magazine.

In 2002, Small began studying Bulgarian vocal production in a start-up Bulgarian women's choir, Yasna Voices. In 2006, Yasna Voices traveled on grant to  Bulgaria to study with master singer Kremena Stancheva, a founding member of the Bulgarian women’s choir,  Le Mystère des Voix Bulgares.

In 2007, Small co-formed Brooklyn's Balkan vocal ensemble, Black Sea Hotel. She has premiered original works with Kronos Quartet in collaboration with Black Sea Hotel at St. Ann's Warehouse.  and National Sawdust, and on stage with Reggie Watts and Sxip Shirey and Joe’s Pub. The vocal trio  was featured in Small's Tableau Vivant of The Delirium Constructions in 2011 and headlined the Lund Choral Festival in Scandinavia in 2018. Black Sea Hotel has taught Balkan folk singing  internationally, with a specialization in songs from Shopluk, Bulgaria. Highlights include teaching residences at Sjöviks Folkhögskola in Sweden.  

In 2009, she taught Portrait Photography to seniors at the Parsons School of Design, and has taught darkroom photography to children and adults. In 2011, her 120-participant Tableau Vivant performance was featured in The Washington Post and The New York Times.  

In 2012, Small formed Hydra, another vocal trio, and performed with Sean Ono Lennon and Taxiplasm at The Box.

In 2014, Small starred in Butter on the Latch, a psychological thriller film directed by Josephine Decker, which was on The New Yorker's “10 Best Movies of 2014.”

In 2016, Small was invited by Beth Morrison and  HERE Arts Center’s PROTOTYPE Festival to premiere her work “Secondary Dominance” on stage, which has since been made into several music videos and a feature film.

As a photographer and performance artist, Small has exhibited and lectured internationally for The Lucie Foundation,, Apple Store Soho, and at the China International Photographic Exhibition granted by the Ministry of Culture of China.

Select photography exhibitions 
 2017 - Fast Forward//Rewind, Museum of Contemporary Art of Georgia, Atlanta, Georgia, US
 2011 - Human Time Space, DOB Hua Lamphong Gallery, Bangkok, Thailand
 2011 - Neubacher Inaugural Exhibition, Neubacher Shor Contemporary, Toronto, Canada
 2010 - 100 Portraits - 100 Photographers, Fotoweek DC, Corcoran Gallery of Art, Washington, D.C., US
 2010 - Art of Photography Show, Lyceum Gallery, San Diego, California, US
 2010 - Vignettes, Bleicher/GoLightly Gallery, Santa Monica, California, US
 2010 - Art Taipei Forum, Taipei World Trade Center, Taipei, Taiwan
 2009 - Bova Images Festival, Bova, Calabria, Italy
 2008 - Delight and Horror: The Photographs of Sarah Small, 1000 Words Photography
 2007 - Soft Ground, Platform Gallery, Winnipeg, Canada
 2004 - Art+Commerce Festival, Emerging Photographers, Tobacco Warehouse, Brooklyn, NY, US

Select performance art 

 2017 - PROTOTYPE Festival - Secondary Dominance
 2011 - Powerhouse Arena - Tableau Vivant of the Delirium Constructions
 2011 - Bathhouse Arena - Tableau Vivant of the Delirium Constructions
 2011 - Skylight One Hanson, Williamsburg Clocktower Building - Tableau Vivant of the Delirium Constructions
 2010 - 92Y Tribeca - Tableau Vivant of the Delirium Constructions

Filmography

Discography

Select music photography 

 2014 Brooklyn Rider, The Brooklyn Rider Almanac
 2009 Kitka, Cradle Songs
 2008 Jan Vogler, Tango!
 2008 Martin Bisi, Sirens of the Apocalypse
 2007 Jan Vogler, Concerti Brillanti
 2006 Shara Nova's My Brightest Diamond, Bring Me the Workhorse

Select photography awards

 2010 - Selected as 1 of 50 Top Finalists for Artists Wanted: Exposure 2010
 2010 - Selected by Magenta Foundation as 2010 US Flash Forward winner
 2009 - “10 Best 10” Photo Contest Winner - Resource Magazine and Win-Initiative
 2009 - 1 of 2 American finalists selected from 65 countries by ITS#EIGHT International Talent Support, to be flown to Italy for exhibition and award ceremony.
 2009 - Selected 1st Place winner for 2009 Fine Art Xto Nude Image Awards to be exhibited in Farmani Gallery in July.
 2009 - Winner of Magnet Media's Zoom-In-Online Viewfinder's Challenge, judged by David Turner and Redux Pictures Director, Marcel Saba.
 2008 - Chosen as 1 of 13 Top Emerging Talents by American Photo Magazine.
 2008 - Avant Guardian Competition Winner - Surface Magazine
 2008 - Finalist - Critical Mass Competition
 2004 - Emerging Photographer Competition Winner - Art + Commerce

References

External links
Artist's website
 Article written by a performer in Tableau Vivant

1979 births
Living people
American artists
Rhode Island School of Design alumni
Rhode Island School of Design alumni in music
American women composers
21st-century American composers
21st-century American singers
21st-century American women musicians
21st-century American women singers
American people of Jewish descent
American women in electronic music
Avant-garde singers
21st-century women photographers
Nudity in theatre and dance
21st-century American women photographers
21st-century American photographers